Damian Milton is a British sociologist and social psychologist who specialises in autism research, and an advocate in the Autism rights movement. He is a lecturer at the University of Kent as well as a consultant for the UK's National Autistic Society and has academic qualifications in sociology, psychology, philosophy, and education.

Milton is best known for his "double empathy problem" theory, which is the idea that, contrary to previous studies in the 20th century had concluded, autistic people do not lack theory of mind but rather that autistic people and neurotypical people struggle with bidirectional theory of mind towards one another due to their neurological differences. While the concept had existed in earlier publications, Milton named and significantly expanded on it.

Milton has been involved with (written or co-written) over 250 publications related to autism research. In his writing, he uses the social model of disability, and many of his publications deconstruct and critically analyse past theories. One of his theories is that self-stimulatory behavior, also known as stimming, helps autistic people to create flow states. His papers describing the need for more autistic voices have been favorably received by the academic community as well as the autistic community. His work has influenced autism groups and major autism researchers such as Simon Baron-Cohen to involve more autistic people in their programs and research. The Genetic Literacy Project has criticised his work to improve communication between autistic and neurotypical people by claiming it oversimplifies the ways people with different types of autism process information and communicate.

Selected works

Journal articles 
 2014: Autistic expertise: A critical reflection on the production of knowledge in autism studies
 2013: Autistics speak but are they heard?
 2014: Going with the flow: reconsidering 'repetitive behaviour' through the concept of 'flow states'''
 2016: How is a sense of well-being and belonging constructed in the accounts of autistic adults? 2018: Making the future together: Shaping autism research through meaningful participation 2012: On the ontological status of autism: the 'double empathy problem' 2018: Redefining Critical Autism Studies: a more inclusive interpretation''

Books

References 

Living people
Social psychologists
Autism activists
Autism researchers
British sociologists
Year of birth missing (living people)